Dykesfield is a hamlet in Cumbria, England. Occupied since at least Roman times, archaeological have excavated at Dykesfield. It contains Dykesfield House and nearby is the Solfield marshes.

See also

Listed buildings in Burgh by Sands

References

Hamlets in Cumbria
Burgh by Sands